The Whitechapel by-election was a Parliamentary by-election held on 30 April 1913. The constituency returned one Member of Parliament (MP) to the House of Commons of the United Kingdom, elected by the first past the post voting system.

Vacancy
Sir Stuart Samuel the Liberal MP for Whitechapel undertook a contract for the Public Service, which required him to resign his seat and face re-election.

Electoral history

Candidates
Sir Stuart Samuel had been Liberal MP for the seat since 1900 and the seat had been Liberal since it was created in 1885. He was opposed by Edgar Browne, who had been his Unionist opponent in December 1910.

Campaign

Votes for women
The National Union of Women's Suffrage Societies, following the adoption of their new policy to not support Liberal candidates, chose not to support either candidate and instead opened a local office from which to carry out propaganda work. The smaller Women's Freedom League, a breakaway group from the Women's Social and Political Union who favoured direct action but opposed violence, also set up a local campaign office. However, the WFL's position on by-elections was specifically anti-government, so they campaigned against the return of the Liberal candidate Samuel and thus by definition in support of his Unionist opponent, Browne.

Result

Aftermath
Samuel retired from politics in 1916 and the Liberals held the resulting by-election unopposed.

References

See also
List of United Kingdom by-elections 
United Kingdom by-election records
1916 Whitechapel by-election

Whitechapel by-election
Whitechapel by-election
Whitechapel,1913
Whitechapel,1913
Whitechapel